Erik Hellsborn (born 1984) is a Swedish politician affiliated with the Sweden Democrats. He was elected as Member of the Riksdag in September 2022 representing the Halland County constituency. He represents the constituency of Halland County.

References 

Living people
1984 births
Place of birth missing (living people)
21st-century Swedish politicians
Members of the Riksdag 2022–2026
Members of the Riksdag from the Sweden Democrats